Schafberg may refer to:

Schafberg (VS, Obergoms), a mountain range east of the Grimsel Pass in Switzerland
Schafberg (BE, Boltigen), a mountain peak in the Bernese Alps of Switzerland above Boltigen
Schafberg (Löbau), a mountain in Saxony, Germany
Schafberg (Ortler Alps), a mountain in the Ortler Alps on the border between Switzerland and Italy
Schafberg (Salzkammergut), a mountain in the Salzkammergut of Austria
Schafberg (Swabian Jura), a mountain in Baden-Württemberg, Germany
Schafberg (Vorarlberg), a mountain in the Alps in Vorarlberg, Austria